Günzer See is a lake in the Vorpommern-Rügen district in Mecklenburg-Vorpommern, Germany. At an elevation of 0.3 m, its surface area is 0.157 km².

Lakes of Mecklenburg-Western Pomerania